Olof Hjalmar "Olle" Hallberg (13 July 1903 – 31 January 1996) was a Swedish long jumper. He competed at the 1928 Summer Olympics and finished in 10th place. Hallberg won the Swedish title in 1925–30, 1932 and 1934, and the English AAA title in 1930. For some time he shared the Swedish national record of 7.53 m with Erik Svensson, and was a member of Swedish Athletics Association.

References

1903 births
1996 deaths
Swedish male long jumpers
Olympic athletes of Sweden
Athletes (track and field) at the 1928 Summer Olympics
People from Östersund Municipality
Sportspeople from Jämtland County
20th-century Swedish people